Polydesmiola meekii is a species of moth of the family Erebidae first described by Thomas Pennington Lucas in 1894. It is found in the Australian states of Queensland and Western Australia.

Adults are greyish brown, with a variable complex pattern on each forewing. The hindwings are brown with dark bands.

References

Moths described in 1894
Calpinae